Amblyseius deductus is a species of mite in the family Phytoseiidae.

References

deductus
Articles created by Qbugbot
Animals described in 1979